The 1993–94 UAB Blazers men's basketball team represented the University of Alabama at Birmingham as a member of the Great Midwest Conference during the 1993–94 NCAA Division I men's basketball season. This was head coach Gene Bartow's 16th season at UAB, and the Blazers played their home games at UAB Arena. They finished the season 22–8, 8–4 in GMWC play and lost in the semifinals of the 1994 GMWC tournament. They received an at-large bid to the NCAA tournament as No. 7 seed in the East region. The Blazers were defeated  by No. 10 seed George Washington, 51–46.

Roster

Schedule and results

|-
!colspan=9 style=| Regular season

|-
!colspan=9 style=| GMWC tournament

|-
!colspan=9 style=| NCAA tournament

Rankings

References

UAB Blazers men's basketball seasons
UAB
UAB